Piermont is a village incorporated in 1847 in Rockland County, New York, United States. Piermont is in the town of Orangetown, located north of the hamlet of Palisades, east of Sparkill, and south of Grand View-on-Hudson, on the west bank of the Hudson River. The population was 2,510 at the 2010 census. Woody Allen set The Purple Rose of Cairo, a fictional film within The Purple Rose of Cairo (1984) in Piermont.

The village's name, in earlier years known as Tappan Landing, was given by Dr. Eleazar Lord, author, educator, deacon of the First Protestant Dutch Church and first president of the Erie Railroad. It was derived by combining a local natural feature – Tallman Mountain – and the most prominent man-made feature of the village – the long Erie Railroad pier.

History

Sparkill Creek cuts through the north end of the Hudson Palisades, providing easy access to the fertile valley of the unnavigable upper Hackensack River. "Tappan Landing," "Tappan Slote", or "Taulman Landing," as the little port on the Hudson River was called, thus became the original port for southern Orange County. The valley in the Palisades created by the creek also provided an obvious route for the Erie Railroad's first-built line (now known as the Piermont Branch), which originated at Suffern, New York, to reach eastward to the Hudson (with water connection to New York City). The railroad built a long pier into the river near the creek in 1839 as its principal terminal.  The pier and the nearby mountains suggested a new name for the community, which was incorporated as a village in 1850.  During World War II the pier was the ferry terminal to which troops from Camp Shanks marched in order to be transported to New York Port of Embarkation piers for transfer to overseas transports bound for the European Theater. A memorial plaque notes that history at the pier.

Late in the 20th century, Piermont became a modest tourist attraction for day-trippers from New York City, particularly those bicycling on Bike Route 9.

Piermont Station
The Piermont Branch was not the only Erie rail line that served the village. Piermont Railroad Station, located on Ash Street, is a Victorian Stick style structure built in 1873 which served as Piermont's stop for the former Erie Railroad Northern Branch north-south line, which went from Nyack, New York, to Jersey City, New Jersey. Service on the Northern Branch stopped running through Piermont in 1966. The branch was abandoned in the 1970s as a result of railroad consolidation.

The exterior of the building was renovated to its original architecture and French gray, light-green and oxide-red color scheme in 2006 by the Piermont Historical Society. They replaced the roof and installed a new  cupola. The train station was placed on the National Register of Historic Places in 2006.

Piermont Fire Department
Piermont Fire Department, Rockland County department 13, is an all-volunteer fire department, providing fire, EMS, and water rescue services, and is located on Main Street. Piermont is one of the few districts in Rockland County having a Dive Rescue team, providing water rescue services from the Tappan Zee Bridge to the Palisades.

Piermont hand-cranked drawbridge
The Piermont hand-cranked drawbridge, also known as the Sparkill Creek Drawbridge, was originally built in 1880 by the King Iron Bridge Company, a company from Cleveland, Ohio, that constructed more than 10,000 bridges over six decades. The hand-cranked drawbridge is used as a pedestrian walkway providing a link to Tallman Mountain State Park.  This bridge is the only hand-cranked drawbridge in Rockland County and perhaps in the United States.  Back in the day, fishermen on sloops heading up and down the creek got out of their vessel, cranked up the drawbridge, sailed across, got out of their vessel and cranked down the drawbridge for vehicular traffic. The whole bridge was dismantled piece by piece, sent off-site for restoration and restored to its original state after a complete forensic analysis. Allan King Sloan, the great-great-grandson of the company's founder, provided some of the information that is on the historical marker nearby and attended the dedication ceremony on August 7, 2009.

Geography
Piermont is located at  (41.040623, -73.918788).

Piermont is on the west bank of the Hudson River, south of the Tappan Zee Bridge.

Demographics

As of the census of 2000, there were 2,607 people, 1,189 households, and 672 families residing in the village. The population density was 3,878.9 people per square mile (1,502.3/km2). There were 1,320 housing units at an average density of 1,964.0 per square mile (760.7/km2). The racial makeup of the village was 78.75% White, 4.72% Black, 0.19% Native American, 7.79% Asian, 5.49% from other races, and 3.07% from two or more races. Hispanic or Latino of any race were 11.62% of the population.

There were 1,189 households, out of which 25.0% had children under the age of 18 living with them, 43.7% were married couples living together, 9.4% had a female householder with no husband present, and 43.4% were non-families. 35.5% of all households were made up of individuals, and 6.4% had someone living alone who was 65 years of age or older. The average household size was 2.19 and the average family size was 2.87.

In the village, the population was spread out, with 19.2% under the age of 18, 6.4% from 18 to 24, 32.7% from 25 to 44, 30.5% from 45 to 64, and 11.2% who were 65 years of age or older. The median age was 40 years. For every 100 females, there were 100.5 males. For every 100 females age 18 and over, there were 98.3 males.

The median income for a household in the village was $61,591, and the median income for a family was $89,846. Males had a median income of $50,659 versus $43,176 for females. The per capita income for the village was $43,731. About 3.0% of families and 9.0% of the population were below the poverty line, including 11.5% of those under age 18 and 4.4% of those age 65 or over.

Notable people
 Alfred Bristol, A 100-year-old World War II veteran of Piermont who served his country in a segregated Army unit is the recipient of this year's Rockland County Buffalo Soldier Award. The award, presented since 1993, is named after the black 10th Cavalry Regiment that was stationed near the railroad construction camps of the Kansas Frontier in 1867. Regiment members were nicknamed “Buffalo Soldiers” by the Plains Indians, based on their exceptional and fearsome fighting reputation. They were never defeated during 23 years of service in the Indian Wars, from 1867 to 1890. Bristol enlisted in the segregated New York Army National Guard in 1931. He belonged to the “Harlem Hellfighters,” the nickname for the 369th Infantry Regiment, which was later reorganized into the 369th Anti-Aircraft Artillery Gun Battalion and was sent to the Pacific during World War II. It participated in the 10th Army Division's invasion and occupation of Okinawa, a Japanese stronghold, in 1945. Upon completing Officer Candidate School, he was commissioned as a second lieutenant, a rarity for blacks at the time. Bristol and his wife, Carolyn, who married in 1941, moved to Shanks Village in Orangeburg after World War II where Bristol organized meetings, dances, parades and the 25-cent “Shanks Carpool” to and from New York City. Bristol played a role in the creation of Tappan Public Library and from 1963 to 1995 served as a trustee and president of the library's board. In 1967, he organized the Art for the Mountain auction to help save Clausland Mountain from development, with the 550-acre site later becoming a county park.
 Grady Anderson of Nanuet, a Vietnam-era Army veteran and the 1996 award recipient, stated “The purpose was to honor African-American unsung heroes in Rockland County who served in the military and, like their predecessors, experienced the wrath of racism, and were successful in their fields and for giving back to the community,” Anderson said. 
 Army veteran David Smith of Montebello, who saw combat in Vietnam and was the 1994 award recipient, thanked Bristol “for allowing me and others to climb up your back, for the path that you laid for us. So I say that with appreciation, affection and love, and I’ll salute you again, sir.”

 William Gaddis, American novelist, lived in Piermont while writing his second novel, J R (1975). The house he lived in served as the setting for his third novel, Carpenter's Gothic (1985). 
 Mimi Bryan was elected Piermont's first woman mayor in 1974. 
 John W. Ferdon (December 13, 1826 – August 5, 1884) Served in the United States House of Representatives, New York State Assembly (Rockland Co.) and New York State Senate (7th D.).
 Pierpoint Isham, Justice of the Vermont Supreme Court
 Al Markim, actor and producer, starred as Astro in the Tom Corbett, Space Cadet television series.
 Paul E. Olsen, professor in the Department of Earth and Environmental Sciences at Columbia University and member of the National Academy of Sciences
 Dennis D. Sweeney (1853-1912), of Piermont, Employed as Yard Conductor in the Erie Yards, Jersey City since about 1885, Veteran in yard service; was a Yard Master of the Rail Road in 1900s, Member of Lodge 56 and Master Switchman then later Grand Master of Lodge 115 in Jersey City, New Jersey of the Switchmen's Mutual Aid Association, was regarded as an industrious and sober man, had money saved in the bank, frequently attended lodge meetings, wrote numerous articles and newsletters in the Switchmen's Journal, was a delegate to the Dallas Convention as Chairman of the Switchmen's Mutual Aid Association, died from a bullet in 1912 while walking in the streets of New York at the corner of Doyers and Bowery at 3:00 p.m. the shots of which were intended for another person supposedly from a Chinese battle (“Pell Street” Battle”) also known as “Tong Fight” going on in the vicinity.

Tourism

Historical markers
 Bogertown - 102 Paradise Avenue
 Sneden House - 38 Paradise Avenue
 Dederer Stone House or Stonehurst

Landmarks and places of interest

 Dederer Stone House or Stonehurst
 Eleanor Stroud Park - A pond and small surrounding park next to Sparkill Creek and under the U.S. Route 9W viaduct. The park is named after a woman who lived near the pond on Ferdon Avenue. For decades she looked after the children who ice skated at the pond and served hot chocolate, coffee, hot dogs and cookies from a nearby shed. The pond is free to the public and open until 9 PM every day the green signal flag is posted.
 William Ferdon House (NRHP)
 First Reformed Church (NRHP)
 Haddock's Hall - 300 Ferdon Avenue (NRHP)
 House at 352 Piermont Avenue (NRHP)
 "Last Stop USA" memorial statue that honors the soldiers that died in World War II. Piermont Pier was the area of disembarkation for soldiers heading to Europe.
 Onderdonk House - 758 Piermont Avenue (NRHP) 
 Piermont Railroad Station - Ash Street (NRHP) 
 The Piermont Historical Society
 Rockland Road Bridge- between Piermont & Ferdon Avenue. (NRHP)
 Rockland Road Bridge Historic District (NRHP)
 Sneden House - 38 Paradise Avenue
 Sparkill Creek Drawbridge- Bridge Street (NRHP)
 Swamp Church -  Carteret Avenue (St Charles A. M. E. Zion Church) In 1865 the black community around the Slote attended the Swamp Church at Skunk Hollow pastored by "Reverend Billy" Thompson.

Notes

External links

 Official Website of the Village of Piermont
 Historical Markers and War Memorials in Piermont, New York
 Dennis P. McHugh Piermont Public Library
 Piermont Historical Society
 A Very Brief History of Piermont, by Piermont Public Library

Villages in New York (state)
Piers in New York (state)
Villages in Rockland County, New York
New York (state) populated places on the Hudson River